Heading for Change (CACH) is a parliamentary group in the Democratic Republic of the Congo that is the minority in parliament, which includes the Union for Democracy and Social Progress party allied to President Félix Tshisekedi. Since the 2018 general election and the 2019 Senate election, CACH has been the minority in parliament after the ruling Common Front for Congo (FCC) coalition, which is aligned with former President Joseph Kabila. CACH and the FCC have been in negotiations to form a new government, which is decided by the parliamentary majority.

References

Political party alliances in the Democratic Republic of the Congo